The One is a 2022 Russian disaster-survival adventure film co-written and directed by Dmitry Suvorov and Andrey Nazarov. The film is based on the real events that occurred in 1981 Aeroflot Flight 811, when rescuers found a twenty-year-old student who survived after falling from a height of 5 kilometers.

The only survivor of the Antonov An-24RV, passenger Larisa Savitskaya, played by Nadezhda Kaleganova, is rescued from the forest on August 27, 1981, the film's cast includes Maksim Ivanov, Viktor Dobronravov and Yan Tsapnik.

The One was theatrically released on June 9, 2022, by "Nashe Kino" ( "Our Cinema").

Plot 
On August 24, 1981, the newlyweds Larisa and Vladimir Savitsky stepped on board the plane following the flight Komsomolsk-on-Amur - Blagoveshchensk, the Soviet Union. 
30 minutes before landing, the AN-24 civilian aircraft collided with a Soviet Air Force Tu-16K bomber and fell to pieces at an altitude of more than 5 kilometers above the ground. 
No one was supposed to survive, but a miracle happened. Larisa Savitskaya woke up in the middle of the wreckage of the plane in the impenetrable taiga. Now she herself had to create a real miracle, which only a strong-minded person is capable of.

Cast 
 Nadezhda Kaleganova as Larisa Savitskaya, based on real events.
 Maksim Ivanov as Vladimir "Volodya" Savitsky
 Viktor Dobronravov as Knyazev
 Yan Tsapnik as a pilot
 Anna Dubrovskaya as Raisa Avdeyeva, Larisa's mother
 Vladimir Vinogradov as Ivan, Larisa's stepfather
 Mariya Sokova as Galina Savitskaya, Volodya's mother
 Vladislav Vetrov as Viktor Savitsky, Volodya's father
 Vitaliya Korniyenko as a little girl in an airplane
 Anna Bachalova as the girl's mother in an airplane
 Leonid Gromov as chairman
 Nikita Tarasov as air traffic controller 1
 Aleksey Polyakov as air traffic controller 2
 Vladimir Steklov as Knyazev's supervisor

Production 
The film is a story about a young married couple flying on a plane that crashed as a result of a collision with a bomber half an hour before landing. Everyone was supposed to die, but Larisa managed to survive. It was filmed in the summer of 2020 in the Perm Krai. Larisa Savitskaya herself was present on the set as a consultant. The script of the film was also written jointly with Larisa based on her stories.

The idea to make this film came from producer Anton Belov after he watched a TV program about plane crash survivors.

Casting 
Larisa Savitskaya also appeared at the premiere, whose story formed the basis of the script.

For Nadezhda Kaleganova, actress of the Moscow Art Theatre named after Chekhov, this is the first big role on the big screen. Kaleganova said that Larisa Savitsaya supported her during the filming, gave her the right attitude.

Filming 
Principal photography began in August 2020, taking place on the territory of Kizel, Gubakha, Gremyachinsk and in other areas of the Perm Krai.

Release 
The One was theatrically released in the Russian Federation on June 9, 2022, by "Nashe Kino" ( "Our Cinema").

See also
 List of sole survivors of aviation accidents and incidents

References

External links 
 

2022 films
2020s Russian-language films
2020s disaster films
2020s adventure thriller films
2020s adventure drama films
2022 thriller drama films
2020s survival films
Russian aviation films
Russian disaster films
Russian adventure thriller films
Russian adventure drama films
Russian thriller drama films
Films about marriage
Films set in the Soviet Union
Films set on airplanes
Films set in forests
Films about tigers
Disaster films based on actual events
Adventure films based on actual events
Films shot in Perm Krai